Big Jake is a 1971 Western film.

Big Jake may also refer to:

 Big Jake (lobster), a large lobster
 Big Jake (horse), a large horse
 Big Jake, a character in Jay Jay the Jet Plane

See also
Big Brother Jake
Big Rude Jake
Jake (disambiguation)